Mimmi is both a surname and a feminine given name. Notable people with the name include:

Surname:
Franco Mimmi (born 1942), Italian journalist and writer
Marcello Mimmi (1882–1961), Italian Roman Catholic archbishop and cardinal

Given name:
Mimmi Bæivi (born 1950), Norwegian politician
Mimmi Kotka (born 1981), Swedish trailrunner
Mimmi Löfwenius (born 1994), Swedish footballer
Mimmi Sandén (born 1995), Swedish singer

See also
Mimmi, Viveca Lärn book series
Mimmi, TV series based on the Viveca Lärn books

Feminine given names